Coptotriche arizonica is a moth of the family Tischeriidae. It is found in North America, including California, Arizona and Texas.

The larvae feed on Quercus species, including Quercus arizonica and Quercus reticulata. They mine the leaves of their host plant.

References

Moths described in 1972
Tischeriidae